The Westwood Press is a Thursday weekly newspaper covering Westwood, Massachusetts, United States, serving the suburb of Boston. It is one of more than 100 weeklies published by Community Newspaper Company, a division of GateHouse Media.

The newspaper covers local news, features and events. The publication is staffed by Editor and Reporter Rob Borkowski, Reporter Edward B. Colby and Staff Photographer Erin Prawoko.

History 
The Westwood Press was part of  Suburban World Newspapers when 
The Boston Herald bought the company in 2001 and dissolved 
it into Community Newspaper Company, the largest weeklies publisher in Massachusetts.  Community Newspaper Company was in turn bought by GateHouse Media in 2006.

External links 
 The Westwood Press
 Gatehouse Media

Newspapers published in Massachusetts
Publications established in 1987